WNMT is a talk radio station in Hibbing, Minnesota that broadcasts over the preassigned frequency of 650 AM. Currently WNMT is owned by Midwest Communications. Midwest also owns five radio stations on the Iron Range; WMFG, WMFG-FM, WNMT, WTBX, and WUSZ. All five stations share the same studio location at 807 W. 37th Street, Hibbing.

WNMT broadcasts a typical AM station pattern during the day which gives it good coverage over most of Northeastern Minnesota. However at nighttime, the station broadcasts a directional pattern from five towers which makes it difficult to receive south of the immediate Iron Range. This is done to protect signals to the south broadcasting on the same frequency; particularly clear-channel station WSM in Nashville, Tennessee.

History
The initial broadcast over WNMT is thought to have been that of the assassination of Presidential contender Robert F. Kennedy the previous night, June 5, 1968.

The former WNMT station broadcast from dawn to dusk nearly every day, and broadcast a variety of family-oriented programming. The owner and operator was an elderly (now deceased) gentleman, surname Watkins, (date of birth contested).

Before changing its callsign to WNMT, 650 AM Hibbing was WKKQ.  WKKQ signed on the air on June 1, 1975 at 1060 AM with a clear channel daytime-only signal.  The station was variously known as "The Super Q" and "Clear Channel Country". The first song played was John Denver's "Thank God I'm a Country Boy". The station signed off at sunset with a special arrangement of "Happy Trails to You" ending with "Happy trails to you from WKKQ". WKKQ was affiliated with the United Press Radio news and provided strong local news and community calendars to compete with Hibbing's pioneer station WMFG. The station moved to 650 AM in the mid-1980s and was allowed to broadcast on reduced power from sunset to sunrise. At one point in time, the station also broadcast in AM Stereo. The move to 650 kHz coincided with a switch to ABC Radio and WKKQ took Paul Harvey from WMFG. In early 1998, the call letters were changed to the current WNMT, followed by a format change in April 1998.

External links
WNMT website

Radio stations in Minnesota
News and talk radio stations in the United States
Radio stations established in 1968
1968 establishments in Minnesota
Midwest Communications radio stations